Koncert may refer to:

 Концерт, Billy Joel album
 Koncert, live performance album of DG 307 (band)
 Koncert (1954 film), a Yugoslav film
 Koncert (1962 film), a Hungarian film by István Szabó
 Koncert (1982 Polish film), a Polish film
 Koncert (1982 Czech film), a Czech film by Jan Schmidt

See also
 Concert

sr:Концерт (вишезначна одредница)